Eurybia sibirica, commonly known as the Siberian aster or arctic aster, is an herbaceous perennial native to north western North America and northern Eurasia. It is found largely in open areas of subarctic boreal forests, though it is also found in a wide variety of habitats in the region. It is similar in appearance to Eurybia merita, but their ranges overlap only near the border between the US and Canada, where E. sibirica is generally found at higher elevations.

Eurybia sibirica is a perennial herb up to 60 cm (2 feet) tall, spreading by means of thin underground rhizomes. The plant produces flower heads either one at a time or in dense flat-topped arrays of 2–50 heads. Each head contains 12–50 white, purple, or pale violet ray florets surrounding 25–125 yellow disc florets. The involucral bracts are reddish-purple (anthocyanic).

Distribution and habitat
Eurybia sibirica is present in much of the subarctic region of world, in northwestern North America and Northern Europe and Northern Asia. It is common in northern Asia (Buryatia, Yakutia, Mongolia, Japan, Chinese Province of Heilongjiang and other parts of North of China). It is also found in European Russia and Scandinavia, as well as northern and western Canada (Alberta, British Columbia, and all 3 Arctic provinces) and United States (Alaska plus the mountains of Washington, Idaho, and Montana). It is found at heights ranging from sea level up to 2200 metres in sandy or gravely soils in disturbed or open areas of boreal forests. It is also present in wet meadows, in open areas of aspen and spruce woods and along riparian thickets. In addition, it is common growing in sandy or gravelly stream flats, along stream banks and the shores of lakes, on bluffs,  in sand dunes and other sandy places, and in both sub-alpine and mountain meadows.

Subspecies
Eurybia sibirica subsp. sibirica 
Eurybia sibirica subsp. subintegerrima (Trautv.) Greuter

References

External links
Alaskan Wildflowers photos
Paul Slichter, The Sunflower Family in Denali National Park and Preserve.  Arctic Aster, Siberian Aster Eurybia sibirica photos
Czech Botany, Eurybia sibirica (L.) G. L. Nesom – Siberian Aster, Arctic Aster in Czech with photos
Plantarium, Aster sibiricus L.  with photos
Korgplantefamilien, Sibirstjerne - Eurybia sibirica photos, captions in Swedish

sibirica
Flora of North America
Flora of Europe
Flora of Asia
Plants described in 1753
Taxa named by Carl Linnaeus